Hassan II was King of Morocco from 1961 until his death in 1999. 

Hassan II or Hasan II may also refer to:

Hassan II of Alamut, or Ḥasan ʿAlā Zikrihi's-Salām, Nizari imam (leader) of the Assassins from 1162 until 1166
Hassan II of the Maldives, fifth Sultan to ascend the throne of Maldives from the Hilaaly Dynasty
Hassan II of the Maldives, Sultan of the Maldives
Hasan II (Bavandid ruler), or Fakhr el Dawlah Hasan, ruler of the Bavand dynasty from 1334 to 1349
Hasan II or Hasan-Jalal Dawla, Armenian feudal prince and namesake of the House of Hasan-Jalalyan